Eyvin Andersen (1914–1968) was a Danish organist, violinist, and composer. He studied at the Royal Danish Academy of Music.

Male composers
Danish classical organists
Male classical organists
Danish classical violinists
Male classical violinists
1914 births
1968 deaths
Royal Danish Academy of Music alumni
20th-century classical violinists
20th-century Danish composers
20th-century organists
20th-century Danish male musicians